Glow is the debut studio album by German record producer Tensnake. It was released on 3 March 2014 in the United States and 10 March 2014 in the United Kingdom. The album features collaborations with Fiora, Jacques Lu Cont, MNEK and Nile Rodgers among others.

Marketing

Singles
The album's lead single "58 BPM" features vocals by Fiora. It was released in the United States through his label True Romance on 27 August 2013, but served as the B-side to "See Right Through" in Europe. An official video to accompany the song was released. The second single from the album, "See Right Through", was released in the United Kingdom on 16 September. Later, a free download of the track "No Relief" was released on Tensnake's SoundCloud page. "Love Sublime" featuring Nile Rodgers and Fiora was released as the album's third single on 28 January 2014 in the United States and alongside remixes in the United Kingdom on 9 March 2014. "Love Sublime" also appears in the soundtrack of the 2014 video game Forza Horizon 2.

Packaging
The artwork for Glow was created by Australian art director and album artist Leif Podhajsky.

Critical response

Upon its release, Glow was met with positive-to-mixed reviews from music critics. Jim Carroll of The Irish Times gave the album three out of five stars, commenting that "finely tuned pop sensibilities and a winning fondness for  hooks are also part of [Tensnake's] make-up". Metro's Arwa Haider also gave the album three stars, praising "First Song" for being "luscious" and describing frequent collaborator Fiora as "vivacious" and "a regular highlight". However, Haider criticised the album's mixture of genres, saying "Glow doesn’t always flow, however, and Tensnake seems to tussle with exactly what kind of album he wants this to be".

Track listing

Release history

Chart positions

References

2014 debut albums